Bocchoris marucalis is a moth in the family Crambidae. It was described by Herbert Druce in 1895. It is found in Xalapa, Mexico.

The forewings and hindwings are pale cream colour, crossed from the costal to the inner margin by a series of dark brown waved lines, a large V-shaped brown mark on the inner margin of the hindwings, the marginal line is dark brown.

References

Moths described in 1895
Spilomelinae